The 1899 Rutgers Queensmen football team was an American football team that represented Rutgers University as an independent during the 1899 college football season. The 1899 Rutgers team compiled a 2–9 record and was outscored by opponents by a combined total of 245 to 114. William V. B. Van Dyck was the team's coach, and William E. McMahon was the team captain.

Schedule

Players
 Black, right tackle
 Conger, right halfback
 Courtney, right tackle
 Edgar, quarterback
 Mann, left halfback
 William E. McMahon, fullback and captain
 Patterson, right guard
 Pettit, right end
 Ranson, center
 Rapalje, left end
 Wirth, left tackle
 Woodruff, left guard

References

Rutgers
Rutgers Scarlet Knights football seasons
Rutgers Queensmen football